Shanghai Chest Hospital is the first hospital in China specializing in cardiovascular systems, lung, esophagus, trachea and mediastinum.

History
Founded in Shanghai in 1866, St. Luke's Hospital was merged with St. Elizabeth's Hospital in 1942 to form St. Luke's & St. Elizabeth's Hospital (or Hongren Hospital). Both hospitals were sponsored by the American Episcopal Church.

Hongren Hospital was affiliated to the Shanghai Second Medical College in 1954. It was reorganised as Shanghai Chest Hospital in 1957. Huang Jiasi served as the first president, and the first vice-presidents were Lan Xichun and Gu Kaishi. In 1957, it was designated by Ministry of Health as a national training center for cadio-vascular and chest surgery. In 1994, it was designated Grade 3, Class A hospital. In 2004, it became Shanghai Red Cross Chest Hospital. Since 2005, it has been affiliated to Shanghai Jiao Tong University.

References

External links
 

Teaching hospitals in Shanghai
Hospitals established in 1957
1957 establishments in China
Shanghai Jiao Tong University
Xuhui District
Hospitals established in 1866
1866 establishments in China